Peter H. Matthews (1873 – July 21, 1916) was an operator of policy games in New York City.

In 1915, agents of Charles Henry Parkhurst's Society for the Prevention of Crime and 45 police officers raided his gambling operations and rounded up a number of persons connected with this crime. Many were known associates of the previous policy king Al Adams. Among them, Matthews and two other ring leaders John J. Saul and Solomon Goldschmidt were arrested, held in bail of $10,000 (in 2005 dollars, more than $184,000) each, and tried. They confessed, were convicted, and were leniently sentenced. In 1916, Matthews died at a city hospital on Blackwells Island, probably while serving his sentence at the penitentiary there.

See also
Lexow Committee
Lottery

Further reading

 New York Times; October 8, 1905; "Al" Adams Has Quit. Says He's Dropped Policy Forever and Would Forget Past Troubles. By Albert J. Adams. My attention has been called to the fact that my name has been extensively coupled with the recent policy raids in Brooklyn. I wish to ask your indulgence in denying the truth of such allegations. Let me say once and for all time, I am absolutely and forever out of politics, gambling policy and all kinds of lotteries.
 Washington Post; May 28, 1915; page 1; Raid 'Policy' Backers.
 New York Times; June 4, 1915; page 4; Wrote Policy 'Gigs' on Back of Sermon.
 New York Times; Thursday, December 2, 1915; page 22; Policy Ring Chiefs Confess to Judge. "Al" Adams's Successors Say Their Capture Frees New York of That Evil. Tell of $200 A Day Profits. Three Leaders Expect Light Sentences Because of Frankness in Revelations. Three of four men who pleaded guilty to policy playing before Justice Weeks in the Criminal Branch of the Supreme Court yesterday were leaders in what has been called the only policy ring able to thrive here since the collapse of "Al" Adams's regime. From the remnants of Adams's operations they developed a syndicate with wide ramifications, which yesterday's procedure, according to Justice Weeks's own statement, completely wiped out of existence.
 Society for the Prevention of Crime (1916). Annual Report. New York City. pp. 9-16.

1873 births
1916 deaths
Criminals from New York City
People from Roosevelt Island
American people who died in prison custody
Prisoners who died in New York (state) detention